Valdó Szűcs (born 29 June 1995) is a Hungarian athlete specialising in the high hurdles. He represented his country at the 2020 Olympic Games in Tokyo where he missed out on the final by 0.08 hundredths of a second. He finished 13th place. Also he represented Hungary at one outdoor and two indoor European Championships and one outdoor World Championship (Doha 2019). 

His personal bests are 13.38 seconds in the 110 metres hurdles (+1.1 m/s, Debrecen 2021) and 7.56 seconds in the 60 metres hurdles (Budapest 2020).

International competitions

References

1995 births
Living people
Hungarian male hurdlers
Competitors at the 2019 Summer Universiade
Athletes (track and field) at the 2020 Summer Olympics
Olympic athletes of Hungary